John Erik Jensen (born 17 May 1945) is a Danish rower. He competed in the men's coxless four event at the 1968 Summer Olympics.

References

1945 births
Living people
Danish male rowers
Olympic rowers of Denmark
Rowers at the 1968 Summer Olympics